Richard Gordon Fleming was Dean of Ontario from 1964 to 1976.

Fleming was educated at McGill University and Selwyn College, Cambridge, and ordained in 1955. He held incumbencies in Marmora and Belleville  before his appointment as Dean.

References

McGill University alumni
Alumni of Selwyn College, Cambridge
Deans of Ontario